Golexanolone, also known by the developmental code name GR-3027, is a neurosteroid medication which is under development for the treatment of hypersomnia and hepatic encephalopathy. It acts as a negative allosteric modulator of the GABAA receptor. The medication selectively antagonizes the stimulatory actions of inhibitory neurosteroids like allopregnanolone and tetrahydrodeoxycorticosterone (THDOC) at the GABAA receptor, while not affecting the activation of the GABAA receptor by γ-aminobutyric acid (GABA).

See also 
 List of neurosteroids § Excitatory

References

External links 
 Golexanolone (GR-3027) - AdisInsight

Tertiary alcohols
Ethynyl compounds
Androstanes
Experimental drugs
Ketoximes